was a Japanese football player. He played for Japan national team.

Club career
Oku was born in Amagasaki on February 7, 1976. After graduating from high school, he joined Júbilo Iwata in 1994. He debuted in 1996. He became a regular player from 1997. The club won the champions at 1997, 1999 J1 League and 1998 J.League Cup. In Asia, the club won the champions 1998–99 Asian Club Championship and the 2nd place 1999–00 and 2000–01 Asian Club Championship. He moved to Yokohama F. Marinos in 2002. The club won the champions in 2003 and 2004 J1 League. He also played as captain and was selected Best Eleven in both seasons. He moved to Yokohama FC in 2007. He retired end of 2007 season.

National team career
In April 1995, Oku was selected Japan U-20 national team for 1995 World Youth Championship. At this competition, he played all 4 matches and scored a goal against Brazil in Quarterfinals.

After 1998 World Cup, in October 1998, Oku was selected Japan national team by new manager Philippe Troussier. On October 28, he debuted for Japan against Egypt. He played at 1999 Copa América and 2000 Asian Cup. At 2000 Asian Cup, he played 4 matches and Japan won the champions. However he was not selected Japan for 2002 World Cup. In 2003, he was selected Japan for the first time in 2 years by manager Zico. He also played at 2003 Confederations Cup. He played 26 games and scored 2 goals for Japan until 2004.

Personal life
Oku married actress Hinako Saeki in 2002. In 2013, Oku was arrested by Kanagawa Prefecture police after he threatened to kill Hinako on multiple occasions. Saeki eventually filed for divorce later that year. But prosecutors decided not to indict Oku.

Death
On the morning of 17 October 2014, Oku was killed following a car accident on Miyako Island. He was driving on a prefectural road at about 4:25 a.m. when his car veered into the opposite lane and struck a telephone pole. According to police, he was transported to a hospital, where he was soon pronounced dead from a broken pelvis and other injuries. There were no other passengers in the car and following his death, police began investigating the cause of the accident.

Club statistics

National team statistics

Honours

Club
Júbilo Iwata
AFC Champions League: 1998–99; runner-up: 1999–2000, 2000–01
Asian Super Cup: 1999
J1 League: 1997, 1999
J.League Cup: 1998; runner-up 2001
Japanese Super Cup: 1998, 2000

Yokohama F. Marinos
J1 League: 2003, 2004
Japanese Super Cup: runner-up 2004, 2005

International
AFC Asian Cup : 2000

Individual
J1 League Best Eleven: 1998, 2003, 2004

References

External links

 
 Japan National Football Team Database
 
 

1976 births
2014 deaths
Association football people from Hyōgo Prefecture
Japanese footballers
Japan youth international footballers
Japan international footballers
J1 League players
Júbilo Iwata players
Yokohama F. Marinos players
Yokohama FC players
1999 Copa América players
2000 AFC Asian Cup players
2003 FIFA Confederations Cup players
AFC Asian Cup-winning players
Road incident deaths in Japan
Sportspeople from Amagasaki
Association football midfielders